The Executioners is a psychological thriller-suspense novel written by John D. MacDonald, published in 1957.

The plot concerns a lawyer being stalked and tormented by a criminal he helped put in prison.

It was filmed twice under the title Cape Fear, once in 1962 and again in 1991. The first film adaptation is more faithful to the novel, with the 1991 adaptation being considerably more brutal and violent.

Plot
The basic plot of the novel concerns an attorney named Sam Bowden, who caught Max Cady, an illiterate, brutal rapist, in the act. Bowden later testifies against him. The jury finds Cady guilty and Cady is sent to prison for fourteen years, where he develops and nurses an obsessive grudge, fueled with rage and hatred over how Bowden sent him to jail. After Cady is paroled, he begins stalking Bowden's family, not only seeking vengeance, but also envying what Bowden has, particularly eyeing Bowden's innocent teenage daughter. Cady's vendetta slowly escalates from stalking and annoying the family to attempting to kill those he deems close to the family.

Bowden sends some thugs to beat Cady hoping to run him off.  Unfortunately, the plan fails and Cady manages to beat them instead.  However, as the cops respond to the fight, Cady swings his arm into a police officer and gets arrested for assaulting a cop.  While this sends him to jail, Bowden realizes he will be back out soon enough.

Cady attempts to kill Bowden's son by shooting him with a high power rifle from far away but fails due to the wind velocity sending the bullet into his son's arm instead.

As his wife is leaving the hospital, she nearly dies in a car crash after Cady removes the lug nuts from one of her wheels.

Desperate, Bowden decides to work with the police to set up a trap.  If Cady enters Bowden's house, he can be shot for trespassing.  The plan is to convince Cady he is out of town.  He will hide in the attic of a detached garage outside the house while a police officer named Kersek covertly stands guard in the house ready to shoot Cady, should he show up.

Bowden anxiously waits in the dead of night with a gun of his own.  Then he hears his wife screaming, followed by gunshots, but badly sprains his ankle falling from the ladder from the detached garage's attic.  As he approaches the front door, it's too dark to see clearly but he can see a shadow of Cady running towards him.  They collide, violently knocking Bowden to the ground, yet Bowden manages to keep hold of his revolver.  As Cady is fleeing the premises, Bowden angrily shoots his gun in Cady's direction and then makes his way inside.  He finds out that Cady began assaulting his wife but was interrupted by Kersek.  Unfortunately, Kersek was not fast enough to kill Cady and Cady killed him instead and then left once he realized this whole thing was a setup.

Cady killed a cop, so the police begin their search for Cady.  As daylight begins, they find a trail of blood in Bowden's backyard.  They follow it and find Cady's corpse.  It turns out Bowden's frantic shot hit Cady and severed an artery and he bled to death.

The Cape Fear River is not featured in the novel, though it is integral in both film adaptations.

Differences between book and films

Source:

References

External links
 https://www.amazon.com/Cape-Fear-Formerly-Titled-Executioners/dp/0449131904/ref=sr_1_1?s=books&ie=UTF8&qid=1367294952&sr=1-1&keywords=cape+fear

1957 American novels
American novels adapted into films
American thriller novels
Novels by John D. MacDonald
Novels about rape
Simon & Schuster books
Works about stalking